The thirteenth season of the One Piece anime series titled , was produced by Toei Animation, and directed by Hiroaki Miyamoto based on Eiichiro Oda's manga by the same name. It deals with the imprisonment of Luffy's brother Portgas D. Ace and Luffy's attempt to infiltrate the great prison Impel Down to save him. Luffy meets several old enemies from his past in this arc, including Buggy the Clown, Mr. 2 (Bon Clay), and Mr. 3. There is also a 4 episode arc set outside the current continuity titled "A Gold Lion's Ambition" (金獅子の野望 Kinjishi no Yabō), which serves as a prologue to the concurrently released One Piece Film: Strong World. This arc features Luffy and his crew's run-in with a group of pirates hired by Shiki, the film's main antagonist. Following this arc, the Impel Down story line continues where it had left off.

The season began broadcasting on Fuji Television on October 18, 2009 and ended on June 20, 2010, totaling 35 episodes. This season's beginning was announced in the One Piece Movie 10 Guide Book, "One Piece-Pia". The season was released through DVD compilations; the first two were released on June 1, 2011. The last two DVD compilations were released on September 6, 2011.

The season used two pieces of theme music. The first opening theme, titled "Share the World" by TVXQ continues to be used for the beginning of the season. The second opening theme, starting from episode 426 onwards, is  performed by Mari Yaguchi with the Straw Hats.


Episode list

Home releases

Japanese

English 
In North America, the season was recategorized as the end of "Season Seven" and the opening of "Season Eight" for its DVD release by Funimation Entertainment. The Australian Season Seven sets were renamed Collection 35 through 38.

References 

2009 Japanese television seasons
2010 Japanese television seasons
One Piece seasons
One Piece episodes